simple:Consternation